The Better Woman is a 2019 Philippine television drama series broadcast by GMA Network. Directed by Mark Sicat dela Cruz, it stars Andrea Torres in the title role, it premiered on July 1, 2019 on the network's Telebabad line up replacing Sahaya. The series concluded on September 27, 2019, with a total of 65 episodes. It was replaced by One of the Baes in its timeslot.

The series is streaming online on YouTube.

Premise
Married couple Jasmine de Villa and Andrew de Villa live in La Union where they own a surf resort. When Andrew heads to Manila for a business meeting, he will encounter Jasmine's lost twin sister, Juliet Santos, whom will eventually reconcile with her estranged biological family, live with her sister and have a love affair with him.

Cast and characters

Lead cast
 Derek Ramsay as Andrew de Villa
 Andrea Torres as Jasmine Santos-de Villa / Juliet Santos / Elaine Reyes / Chloe dela Cruz

Supporting cast
 Jaclyn Jose as Erlinda Santos
 Ina Feleo as Angela de Villa-Castro
 Marco Alcaraz as Glenn Santiago
 Ashley Rivera as Chesi Rodriguez
 Paolo Paraiso as Joross Baltazar
 Frances Makil-Ignacio as Amy Santos
 Jenzel Ho as Ella
 Joemarie Nielsen as Greg
 Erlinda Villalobos as Luring 
 Tommy Abuel as Ronaldo Laserna
 Maureen Larrazabal as Ruby
 Jay Arcilla as Michael San Luis
 Yuan Francisco as Kawaii de Villa Castro
 Bryce Eusebio as Kyrie de Villa Castro
 Ana de Leon as Nancy
 Mike Lloren as Roman Reyes
 Cheska Diaz as Edith Reyes
 Marx Topacio as Jong
 Prince Clemente as Basti
 Renz Fernandez as Paolo
 Lindsay de Vera as Ashley

Guest cast
 Barbara Miguel as young Jasmine and Juliet / Elaine
 Empress Schuck as young Erlinda
 Wilma Doesnt as Raissa Pagurigan-Santos
 Ervic Vijandre as Rafael "Paeng" Amante
 Mela Franco Habijan

Accolades

References

External links
 
 

2019 Philippine television series debuts
2019 Philippine television series endings
Filipino-language television shows
GMA Network drama series
Television shows set in the Philippines